Hugh Earnshaw (16 February 1939 – 31 December 1982) was an  Australian rules footballer who played with Geelong in the Victorian Football League (VFL).

Notes

External links 

1939 births
1982 deaths
Australian rules footballers from Victoria (Australia)
Geelong Football Club players
Rutherglen Football Club players